Xavier Phillips (born 1971 in Paris) is a French contemporary classical cellist, the brother of violinist Jean-Marc Phillips-Varjabédian.

Biography 
Xavier Phillips started learning the cello at the age of 6. He entered the Conservatoire de Paris in 1986 and studied with Philippe Muller. He obtained the First Prize of the Conservatory in 1989. After a third prize at the Rostropovich Competition in 1989, he continued his training with Mstislav Rostropovitch, who particularly noticed him. They worked together for a dozen years, the master inviting him regularly as a soloist of the orchestras he was led to direct.

Xavier Phillips premiered the Cello Concerto by Jean-Louis Agobet in Caen on 19 March 2010.

Xavier Phillips plays on a 1710 made cello by Matteo Goffriller.

Selected discography 
Sonates pour violoncelle et piano: sonata by Alfred Schnittke; sonata Op. 40 in D minor by Shostakovich; sonata Op. 119 in C major by Prokofiev with Hüseyin Sermet as the pianist, at Harmonia mundi, HMN 911628.
 Armenia: Interpretations of Armenian composers' works (Aram Khachaturian, Arno Babadjanian...etc); with Vahan Mardirossian and Jean-Marc Phillips-Varjabédian, at Lontano-Warner.

References

External links 
  Biography on Musicaglotz
 Xavier Phillips on France Musique
 Xavier Phillips on France Info
 Xavier Phillips on Orchestre de chambre de Paris
 Xavier Phillips on La Folle Journée
 Xavier Phillips on Orchestre de l'Alliance
  Xavier Phillips on Mariisky Theatre
 Boccherini - Cello concert Bb-dur, Xavier Phillips on YouTube
 Xavier Phillips - Tout un monde lointain de Henri Dutilleux - part 1 of 5 on YouTube

Musicians from Paris
Conservatoire de Paris alumni
French classical cellists
1971 births
living people